Sphephelo S'Miso "Yaya" Sithole (born 3 March 1999) is a South African professional soccer player who plays as a midfielder for Belenenses SAD.

Professional career
Sithole made his professional debut with Belenenses SAD in a 1–1 Primeira Liga tie with S.C. Braga on 15 July 2020.

References

External links
 
 

1999 births
Living people
Soccer players from Durban
South African soccer players
Association football defenders
Belenenses SAD players
Primeira Liga players
Campeonato de Portugal (league) players
South African expatriate soccer players
South African expatriate sportspeople in Portugal
Expatriate footballers in Portugal